Eduard Kaiser (22 February 1820 in Graz – 30 August 1895 in Vienna) was an Austrian painter and lithographer, as was his brother Alexander Kaiser (1819–1872).  He was a celebrated portrait artist who drew the attention of Elisabeth, Empress of Austria.

Life
Eduard Kaiser was the son of Joseph Franz Kaiser, the owner of a lithographic business in Graz. He studied at the Wiener Akademie beside Josef Danhauser and soon became a serious competitor for the top Vienna portrait-lithographer Josef Kriehuber. Enthused by the ideas of the revolution, in 1848 Kaiser joined the Academic Legion - during this time he made portraits of almost all the main figures of the March Revolution (Josef Radetzky, Franz Schuselka, Hans Kudlich Adolf Fischhof, Carl Giskra). In 1852/53 he lived in Rome. After returning to Austria he developed a very profitable portrait-lithography business, with clients including Franz Joseph I of Austro-Hungary, his empress Elisabeth of Austro-Hungary, Friedrich Hebbel, Robert Schumann and Clara Schumann.
 
In 1867–1886 he lived in Rome again, where he devoted himself very successfully to watercolour reproductions of classical masterpieces - these reproductions were then sold in Great Britain as colour lithographs. He then returned to Vienna and to portrait painting in oils and watercolour.

Selected lithographs

Bibliography 

  Kaiser, Eduard. In Constantin von Wurzbach: Biographisches Lexikon des Kaiserthums Oesterreich. 10. Band. Wien 1863. Online-Version: 
  Eduard Kaiser. In: Ulrich Thieme, Felix Becker etc.: Allgemeines Lexikon der Bildenden Künstler von der Antike bis zur Gegenwart. Volume 19, E. A. Seemann, Leipzig 1926, S. 443f

1820 births
1895 deaths
Austrian portrait painters
19th-century Austrian painters
Austrian male painters
Austrian lithographers
Austrian watercolourists
Portrait miniaturists
Artists from Graz
Academy of Fine Arts Vienna alumni
19th-century Austrian male artists